Sarawak Football Association Under-21s or sometimes called Sarawak B team, is the most senior of Sarawak's youth teams. They play in the Malaysian President's Cup.

They play their home matches at the Sarawak Stadium's Field C or D. The Under-21s are managed by Abdul Jalil Ramli, with Pengiran Bala as assistant coach and also Abu Bakar Amran as fitness coach.

Club officials

Team management
Table as updated on 10 July 2019

Under-21s

References

External links
 Sarawak FA Official Site
 Sarawak Crocs Official Site
 ultrasarawak.com Peminat Sarawak FA

Youth and Academy
Malaysian reserve football teams
Football academies in Malaysia
1985 establishments in Malaysia